Richard Charles Jackson (born 22 January 1961) is a British Anglican bishop. He is the current Bishop of Hereford in the Church of England and a former Bishop suffragan of Lewes.

Early life and education
Jackson was born on 22 January 1961. He studied at Latymer Upper School, then at Christ Church, Oxford, graduating with a Bachelor of Arts (BA) degree in 1983. He studied at the Cranfield Institute of Technology, completing a Master of Science (MSc) degree in 1985. In 1992, he matriculated into Trinity College, Bristol, an Evangelical Anglican theological college: he spent the next two years studying theology and training for ordained ministry.

Ordained ministry
Jackson was ordained into the Church of England: made a deacon at Petertide 1994 (2 July), by Eric Kemp, Bishop of Chichester, at Chichester Cathedral; and ordained a priest the Petertide following (2 July 1995), by Lindsay Urwin, Bishop of Horsham, at St Mary's, Horsham. After a curacy in Lindfield he was Vicar of Rudgwick from 1998 until 2009 (also Rural Dean of Horsham from 2005) when he became the Diocese of Chichester's Advisor for Mission and Renewal.

Episcopal ministry
Jackson was consecrated as a bishop on 14 May 2014 at Westminster Abbey by Justin Welby, Archbishop of Canterbury. From then, he served as Bishop of Lewes, a suffragan bishop in the Diocese of Chichester. It was announced on 3 September 2019 that Jackson was to become the next Bishop of Hereford; he was elected to that See on 6 December 2019 and his election confirmed 7 January 2020.

Views
Jackson is evangelical and charismatic in churchmanship.

In January 2023, Jackson stated that he commended the proposed introduction of blessings for same-sex couples by the Church of England, and extended an apology to people who identify as LGBTQI+ for hurtful experiences in the church; "I know I bear some responsibility in this, and I am sorry for the hurt this has caused.". However, he also signed an open letter in response to the proposal which stated:

References

Alumni of Christ Church, Oxford
1961 births
Living people
Bishops of Lewes
Bishops of Hereford
Alumni of Cranfield University
Alumni of Trinity College, Bristol
Evangelical Anglican bishops
People from Rudgwick